Carter Alswinn Kieboom (born September 3, 1997) is an American professional baseball third baseman for the Washington Nationals of Major League Baseball (MLB).

Amateur career
Kieboom attended George Walton Comprehensive High School in Marietta, Georgia. He committed to attend Clemson University to play college baseball for the Clemson Tigers. He was drafted by the Washington Nationals in the first round of the 2016 Major League Baseball Draft.

Professional career
Kieboom announced he would be signing with the Nationals and joining the organization on June 11, 2016. He spent his first professional season with the Gulf Coast League Nationals where he batted .244 with four home runs and 25 RBIs. In 2017 with the Class-A Hagerstown Suns, he was hitting .333 and six home runs and 20 RBIs before a hamstring injury on May 12 placed him on the disabled list. Kieboom was named to the Northern Division All-Star team in the South Atlantic League, alongside several Suns teammates. Both Baseball America and MLB Pipeline listed Kieboom as the Nationals' fourth-best prospect as of their 2017 season. After returning to action late in the season, Kieboom played in six games with the GCL Nationals and seven games with the Auburn Doubledays before returning to Hagerstown. Across all three levels, he had a .297 batting average with nine home runs in 61 games for the 2017 season.

Playing for the High-A Potomac Nationals in 2018, Kieboom was named a Carolina League All-Star, one of six Potomac players so honored. In the All-Star Game, he hit a home run while going 3-for-5. He was promoted to the Class-AA Harrisburg Senators for the first time following the All-Star Game, homering off Baltimore Orioles prospect Keegan Akin in his first game at the higher level on June 21, 2018. Representing Team USA, he was one of two Nationals minor league players, along with Dominican-raised infielder Luis García for Team World, selected to play in the All-Star Futures Game at Nationals Park in 2018.

Kieboom began the 2019 season with the Fresno Grizzlies of the Class AAA Pacific Coast League. On April 26, 2019, the Nationals purchased Kieboom's contract and promoted him to the major league roster for a series against the San Diego Padres. He made his debut that night and hit a home run for his first major league hit.

Kieboom was named to the 2019 Futures Game. Kieboom played 11 games with the Nationals with a .128 average and 2 home runs. The Nationals finished the 2019 year 93-69, clinching a wild card spot and eventually winning the World Series over the Houston Astros. Kieboom did not participate in any postseason action but still won his first world championship.

Following the departure of veteran third baseman Anthony Rendon after the 2019 season, Nationals manager Dave Martinez said in January 2020 that Kieboom would move to third base full time, with the expectation that he would step in as Rendon's permanent replacement in the 2020 season. In 2020 for the Nationals, Kieboom played in 33 games, hitting .202/.344/.212 with no home runs and 9 RBI before ending his season early due to a left wrist contusion.

On March 20, 2022, it was announced that Kieboom would miss 4-6 weeks while recovering from a flexor mass strain near his right elbow, and he was placed on the 60-day injured list the following day. On May 20, it was announced that Kieboom would require Tommy John surgery, and would miss the 2022 season.

Personal life
His brother, Spencer Kieboom, played for the Nationals in their 2018 season.

References

External links

1997 births
Living people
American people of Dutch descent
Auburn Doubledays players
Baseball players from Marietta, Georgia
Fresno Grizzlies players
Gulf Coast Nationals players
Hagerstown Suns players
Major League Baseball shortstops
Potomac Nationals players
Rochester Red Wings players
Salt River Rafters players
Washington Nationals players